Burn Me Wicked is the sixth album by Danish death metal band Illdisposed.

Track listing

   Shine Crazy - 3:36
   Case of the Late Pig - 3:49
   Back to the Street - 3:51
   Our Heroin Recess - 4:23
   Throw Your Bolts - 3:53
   Burn Me Wicked - 3:46
   Fear the Gates - 2:42
   Slave - 4:29
   Nothing to Fear... Do It - 3:19
   The Widow Black - 4:27
   Illdispunk'd - 3:39
   Dark (re-release only bonus track, live) - 4:51
   Weak Is Your God (re-release only bonus track, live) - 3:46

Personnel
 Bo Summer - vocals
 Jakob Hansen guitar
 Martin Thim - guitar
 Jonas Mikkelsen  - bass
 Thomas "Muskelbux" Jensen - drums
All lyrics written by Bo Summer
All music written by Jakob Batten
Clean vocals performed by Mikkel Sandager (ex-Mercenary)
Keyboards by the K9 Agency
Artwork by Lasse Hoile

Trivia 
The album was re-released through Massacre Records after the band signed the deal with them.
Tore Mogensen is also listed in the linernotes (Mogensen appears curtesy of his wife). It is believed that he also contributed by playing leads and/our writing additional parts like on 1-800 Vindication.

Illdisposed albums
2006 albums
Roadrunner Records albums
Massacre Records albums